There are two species of anole named slender anole:

 Anolis fuscoauratus, native to northern South America
 Anolis limifrons, native to Guatemala, Belize, Honduras, Nicaragua, Costa Rica, and Panama